Alguien que me quiera (English: Someone to love me) is an Argentine serie tv produced by Pol-ka and broadcast by El Trece from February 1 to November 15, 2010.

Cast 
 Osvaldo Laport as Rodolfo Rivera
 Andrea Del Boca as Rocío Mosconi / Ana Insúa
 Miguel Ángel Rodríguez as Armando Cutuli
 Viviana Saccone as Katia Pérez Alfonso
 Susú Pecoraro as Paloma
 Luisana Lopilato as Bianca Rivera
 Marco Antonio Caponi as Renzo Peralta
 Calu Rivero as Lola Rivera
 Ludovico Di Santo as Teo Carrasco 
 Gerardo Romano as Roberto
 María Leal as Malvina Andrade
 Nacho Gadano as Mauro
 Jorgelina Aruzzi as Josefina "Pepa" Andrade
 Julia Calvo as Rita "Pina" Ayala
 Francisco Donovan as Guillermo "Willy"
 Sofía Elliot as Olivia.
 Alejandro Awada as Sandro
 Juan Palomino as Gastón Pineda
 Vivian El Jaber as Brenda "Coca" Reinoso
 Michel Gurfi as Nicolás Vega
 Paula Morales as Lisa
 Florencia Torrente as Mandy 
 Gastón Ricaud as Máximo
 Chino Darín as Stuka
 Diego Bugallo as Leonel
 Andrea Campbell as Alicia Cutuli 
 Salo Pasik as Carmelo Vega 
 Natalia Lobo as Carola 
 María Fernanda Neil as Tasha Nuñez 
 Nicolas Pauls as Gonzalo 
 Diego Olivera as Bautista/Lucas
 Pepe Monje as Nito "Super Nito"
 Florencia Otero as Lucía 
 Tomás de las Heras as Tomás
 Andrea Estévez as Analía
 Sabrina Carballo as Jade
 Nicolás Pauls as Pablo
 Gustavo Conti as Pucho
 Manuela Pal as Carolina
 Luis Sabatini as Aguirre
 Alejandra Darín as Clara
 Luis Machín as Gustavo "Bambi" Melgarejo
 Daniel Casablanca as Chito

International broadcasts 
 : Teledoce
 : Unicanal

Awards and nominations 
Premio Martín Fierro 2010
 Nominated - Best Original Musical Theme - Palito Ortega and Hilda Lizarazu
 Nominated - Revelation - Calu Rivero

Kids' Choice Awards Argentina 2011
 Nominated - Best Actress - Luisana Lopilato
 Nominated - Favorite Villain - Calu Rivero
 Nominated - Revelation - Calu Rivero

References

External links 
  
 

2010 telenovelas
Argentine telenovelas
Pol-ka telenovelas
2010 Argentine television series debuts
2010 Argentine television series endings
Spanish-language telenovelas